Tang-e Kur (also Romanized as Tang-e Kūr and Tang Kūr) is a village in Mishan Rural District, Mahvarmilani District, Mamasani County, Fars Province, Iran. At the 2006 census, its population was 32, in 9 families.

References 

Populated places in Mamasani County